Ujjain Public School is an English Medium Higher Secondary school located at Dewas Road, Ujjain,  India, which is affiliated with the Madhya Pradesh Board of Secondary Education. It was established in 1991 and now has classes from Nursery to Class XII. The current principal is Mr. Ashok Joshi.

In April 2009,  a student from UPS stood first in the entire state of Madhya Pradesh in the Higher Secondary School Certificate Examination for Class XII.

References

Schools in Madhya Pradesh
Education in Ujjain
1991 establishments in Madhya Pradesh
Educational institutions established in 1991